Lucas Ramos de Oliveira (born 18 January 1996) is a Brazilian professional footballer who plays as a midfielder for Indonesian club Dewa United.

Career

Flamurtari
In February 2020, Ramos joined Albanian club Flamurtari. He made his league debut for the club on 16 February 2020, playing the entirety of a 1–0 away victory over Luftëtari.

References

1996 births
Living people
Brazilian footballers
Association football midfielders
Brazilian expatriate footballers
Guarani FC players
Elosport Capão Bonito players
Sociedade Esportiva Itapirense players
Apollon Larissa F.C. players
PAS Lamia 1964 players
Veria NFC players
Flamurtari Vlorë players
KF Laçi players
PAEEK players
Dewa United F.C. players
Gamma Ethniki players
Super League Greece players
Kategoria Superiore players
Cypriot First Division players
Liga 1 (Indonesia) players
Brazilian expatriate sportspeople in Greece
Brazilian expatriate sportspeople in Albania
Brazilian expatriate sportspeople in Cyprus
Brazilian expatriate sportspeople in Indonesia
Expatriate footballers in Greece
Expatriate footballers in Albania
Expatriate footballers in Cyprus
Expatriate footballers in Indonesia
Footballers from São Paulo